Rhyncholaelia, abbreviated Rl. in the horticultural trade, is a genus of orchids (family Orchidaceae), comprising two species. They are distributed in Mexico, Guatemala, Belize, and Honduras. Both species were originally published in Brassavola by Lindley.  In 1918, Schlechter erected the new genus Rhyncholaelia and moved  Brassavola digbyana Lindl. 1846 and Brassavola glauca Lindl. 1839 into it.

Species 
Rhyncholaelia digbyana  (Lindl.) Schltr.
Rhyncholaelia glauca  (Lindl.) Schltr.

Hybrids
Rl. Aristocrat (= Rl. glauca × Rl. digbyana), registered by M. Roccaforte (1973) as Brassavola Aristocrat
Rl. Memoria Coach Blackmore (= Rl. digbyana × Rl. Aristocrat), registered by S. Blackmore (2003)

References

External links
 
 

 
Laeliinae genera